Solanum chilliasense is a species of nightshade that is endemic to Ecuador.

References

chilliasense
Flora of Ecuador
Vulnerable plants
Taxonomy articles created by Polbot